Gerasimos Mitoglou (born 20 October 1999) is a Greek professional footballer who plays as a centre-back for Super League club AEK Athens.

Career

Volos
On 9 July 2019, Mitoglou joined Volos on a free transfer.

On 15 February 2021, he signed a contract extension, running until the summer of 2024. On 10 April 2021, he scored his first professional goal in a 3–1 home win against Panetolikos.

AEK Athens
On 25 May 2021, Mitoglou signed for AEK Athens, following an announcement from Volos on their social media, saying that they had reached an agreement with AEK to sell Mitoglou to them, on a four-year contract until June 2025. On 11 June 2021, the four-year contract became official. On 31 October 2021, he scored his first goal with the club in a vital 2–1 home win game against Aris Thessaloniki.

Personal life
Mitoglou's father, Dimitrios, is a former professional footballer, while his brother is the international basketball player Dinos.

Career statistics

Club

References

1999 births
Living people
Super League Greece players
Gamma Ethniki players
Agrotikos Asteras F.C. players
Volos N.F.C. players
AEK Athens F.C. players
Association football central defenders
Footballers from Athens
Greek footballers